Uttara University or UU is a private university at Uttara, in Dhaka, Bangladesh. UU has twelve campuses in a less than one-kilometer radius and is based in the satellite town of North Dhaka.

Since its inception, UU has maintained a fully clean and transparent record as a non-government university. It was founded in 2003 by Dr M Azizur Rahman with the sole motive of making higher education accessible and available to the middle and lower-middle-income groups. It enjoys a reputation of a very high standard of education at an affordable tuition. Almost 99% of UU students study on some kind of waiver and scholarship, enabling them to pay a much lower tuition fee than the tuition fees published on the website.
The permanent campus of UU is currently under construction (Aug, 2022). It is situated at Uttara phase-3 and will be a state-of-the-art modern campus with smart classrooms. The main building will be one of 14 floors. Construction is scheduled to be completed by 2023.

Convocation
The first convocation of Uttara University was held on 16 June 2009. The chancellor of Uttara University and the President of the People's Republic of Bangladesh Md. Zillur Rahman presided over the convocation program, when 1088 graduate and undergraduate students received their certificates. A. A. M. S. Arefin Siddique, vice chancellor of Dhaka University was scheduled as the convocation speaker.

The Second convocation of Uttara University was held on 4 July 2011.

The Third convocation was held in 2014 for students who completed their degree between 2010 and 2014.

The Fourth convocation took place in 2016 at BICC.

The Fifth convocation took place in January 2017 at BICC.

The Sixth convocation ceremony took place at International Convention City Bashundhara - 4 (ICCB) on the 30th of October 2018. The day long program was telecasted live on Channel i and more than 3,000 students graduated. The convocation was presided by the Education Minister Nurul Islam Nahid MP and UGC Chairman Abdul Mannan.

The Seventh Convocation of UU was held on July 24, 2022, where 3,804 students graduated. The event was aired live on Channel i and was heavily covered by all news media. UU also enjoyed a full page coverage on that day by the top two daily newspapers- Prothom Alo & The Daily Star. Honourable Minister of Education Dr Dipu Moni presided over the ceremony which was followed by a cultural program.

List of Vice-Chancellors 
 Professor Dr. M. Azizur Rahman ( Current ).

Academic Structure
Uttara University is organized into five schools and fourteen departments. The university offers 40 programs in undergraduate and postgraduate levels. There are 35+ full time professors and every department has senior faculty members. In recent times, UU has applied for inclusion in ranking at an international level. UU is often visited by international PhD researchers and publishes a large number of journals and publications. A separate Career Placement service office is in fruition at the university which will directly cater to the internship and placement needs of the graduates. UU has been keeping its tuition fees low and maintaining quality of education in line with its mission and vision. Its academic structure is as follows:

School of Business
Department of Business Administration
 BBA
 MBA
 EMBA

School of Science and Engineering
Department of Computer Science & Engineering
 B.Sc. in Computer Science & Engineering
 M.Sc. in Computer Science & Engineering
Department of Electrical & Electronic Engineering
 B.Sc. in Electrical & Electronic Engineering
Department of Mathematics
 B.Sc. (Hons) in Mathematics
 M.Sc. (Preli) in Mathematics
 M.Sc. (Final) in Mathematics
Department of Physics
 M.Sc. (Preli) in Physics
 M.Sc. (Final) in Physics
 M.Sc. (Final) in Psychology

School of Civil, Environment & Industrial Engineering
Department of Civil Engineering
 B.Sc. in Civil Engineering
Department of Fashion Design & Technology
 B.Sc. in Fasion Design & Merchandising Tech
 B.Sc. in Fashion Design & Tech
 MBA in Apparel Merchandising & Fashion Management (1 YEAR)
 MBA in Apparel Merchandising & Fashion Management (2 YEARS)
Department of Textile Engineering
 B.Sc. in Textile Engineering

School of Arts and Social Sciences
Department of English
 Bachelor of Arts with Honours in English
 Master of Arts (Preliminary) in English
 Master of Arts (Final) in English
 MA in ELT (1 year)
 MA in ELT (2 years)
Department of Law
 LL.B Honours (4 years) 
 LL.M (1 year)
 LL.M (2 years)
Department of Islamic Studies
 BA (HONS) in Islamic Studies
 MA (2 years) in Islamic Studies
 MA (Final) in Islamic Studies
Department of Bengali language | Bangla
 BA (HONS) in Bengali 
 MA (2 years) in Bengali 
 MA (Final) in Bengali

School of Education and Physical Education
Department of Education
 B.Ed. (Hons)
 B.Ed.
 M.Ed.
Department of Physical Education
 B.P.Ed
 M.P.Ed

Financial and Academic Facilities
Keeping in line with UU's mission and vision of providing education at affordable tuition, a waiver committee sits every semester to match costs of other private universities in the city. Waivers and scholarships are offered in a competitive manner enabling UU to maintain its reputation as an affordable higher education gateway while maintaining international standards of education. Scholarships are provided in the range of 10%-100%, Special Waivers for Diploma students, merit based scholarships (100% free for GPA-5 achievers) and financial support to poor students. Children of the Freedom Fighters are given the opportunity to study for free. UU has partnered with Bank Asia in providing Student Support Loan to students. It is a non-secured loan which a guardian or a student can apply for to support the entire cost of the education and UU is the first to introduce it after the Bangladesh Bank has given its formal approval.

UU has eight libraries, state-of-the-art computer laboratories, Digital engineering laboratory, English language audio-visual studio lab, Textile labs, EEE labs, Civil Engineering labs and a physics laboratory.

UU has also developed its very own Enterprise Resource Planning (ERP) software which gives students an easy, hassle-free and integrated experience.

Student clubs in the university are very active and students are encouraged to participate at different events. The Binary Fest which makes it to the newspapers every year is organized by UU.

Few prominent sports personalities are alumni of the Physical Education Department and a couple of TV-show celebrities are part of the current student body. 50% tuition scholarships are given to such individuals who has contributions in sports and culture.

Siblings & spouses are given additional financial waivers. Children of Freedom Fighters and GPA-5 holders get the opportunity to study for free.

References

External links
 Uttara University website

Universities of Uttara
Private universities in Bangladesh
Educational institutions established in 2004
Universities and colleges in Dhaka
2004 establishments in Bangladesh